Mi prima Ciela (English title:My Cousin Ciela) is a Venezuelan telenovela produced and broadcast by RCTV in 2007. It is a remake of two Venezuelan telenovelas, Elizabeth and Maite, both produced by the same channel in the 1980s based on a story written by Pilar Romero.

Monica Spear and Manuel Sosa as the main protagonists, and co-starring Flavia Gleske, Geronimo Gil, Raquel Yanez and Guillermo Perez.

Plot
Graciela Andreína is a young woman in her final year of high school and lives with her two cousins Maite and Silvia, and they all form an inseparable trio. Silvia discovers she is pregnant by Rafael, a young person working in the business ran by Graciela's parents. At first nobody accepts Rafael because he is an ex-convict, but when he runs off with Silvia to get married, everyone is forced to accept him. Maite will have to fight her mother who wants her to become a doctor to follow her dream of studying music. Once she gets into music school, she meets Abel, and with him, she endures a love filled with misunderstandings and suffering.

Graciela, who is affectionately called Ciela discovers that she was adopted even though her parents have tried to keep the secret from her. Ciela meets David, an attractive young man with a flawed character, and they fall in love and get married. However, Ciela is diagnosed with bone marrow failure, Ciela does not stop fighting for her happiness.

Cast

References

External links
 

2007 telenovelas
Venezuelan telenovelas
RCTV telenovelas
Spanish-language telenovelas
2007 Venezuelan television series debuts
2007 Venezuelan television series endings
Television shows set in Caracas